The Devil's Garden is a lost  1920 American silent drama film produced by Whitman Bennett, directed by Kenneth Webb, and released through First National Exhibitor's Circuit, which was later known as First National Pictures. The film starred Lionel Barrymore, May McAvoy, and Barrymore's first wife Doris Rankin. It is based on the 1913 novel, The Devil's Garden by William Babington Maxwell, and was the first film for Whitman Bennett Productions.

Cast
Lionel Barrymore as William Dale
Doris Rankin as Mavis Dale
May McAvoy as Norah
H. Cooper Cliffe as Lors Barradine

References

External links

lobby poster

1920 films
American silent feature films
Films directed by Kenneth Webb
Lost American films
Films based on British novels
1920 drama films
Silent American drama films
First National Pictures films
American black-and-white films
1920 lost films
Lost drama films
1920s American films